Goxua (which means "sweet" in Basque) is a typical dessert from the Basque Country, especially from Vitoria-Gasteiz. Gasteiz pastry chef Luis Lopez de Sosoaga claims to have first created the dessert in 1977. Although its invention is popularly attributed to the pastry chef from Vitoria Luis López de Sosoaga, the pastry chef from Mirandese Alberto Bornachea affirms that goxua was invented by his father trying to copy the Catalan cream, baptizing the resulting dessert as cazuelita.

Characteristics 
Goxua consists of a base of whipped cream, one layer of sponge cake and a layer of caramelized custard. In the northern part of the Basque Country, it is usually filled with jam. There are two ways to serve goxua: in individual bowls as if it was custard or curd, or the traditional form of cake in a clay pot.

References 
 Goxua recipe at Sukal Leku.

Spanish pastries
Basque cuisine